Nižná Slaná is a village and municipality in the Rožňava District in the Košice Region of middle-eastern Slovakia.

History
In historical records the village was first mentioned in 1360.

Geography
The village lies at an altitude of 360 metres and covers an area of 18.96 km².
It has a population of about 1210 people.

Culture
The village has a public library, a gymnasium and a football pitch.

External links
https://web.archive.org/web/20070513023228/http://www.statistics.sk/mosmis/eng/run.html

Villages and municipalities in Rožňava District